Left Right Left is a 2013 Indian Malayalam-language political drama film, directed by Arun Kumar Aravind and written by Murali Gopy.  Left Right Left revolves around the lives of Jayan (Indrajith Sukumaran), Roy (Murali Gopy), Sahadevan (Hareesh Peradi), Anitha (Lena Kumar) and Jennifer (Remya Nambeesan). Released on 14 June 2013, the film was set in three periods – the 60s/70s, the 80s/90s and the present day. It got mostly positive reviews upon release but drew occasional criticism for some of its characters and scenes resembling real-life political leaders and incidents. However, it has gathered a cult status over the years as one of the finest political thrillers ever made in Malayalam. Murali Gopy's performance won him the 61st Filmfare Awards South for The Best Actor in a Supporting Role and Lena Kumar won Kerala State Film Award for the Second Best Actress.Filmicompanion in 2019 included Hareesh Peradi's performance in the Top 100 performances of the decade.

Plot

The story revolves around P. K. Jayan aka 'Vattu' (Mad) Jayan, Roy Joseph aka 'Che Guevera' Roy and Kaitheri Sahadevan . The film opens with formative events from their childhood - Sahadevan and Roy losing their fathers to thugs employed by their opponents (in two separate incidents), and Jayan losing his ill sister to lack of money for an operation. Jayan grows up to become a somewhat corrupt police sub inspector, Roy a communist who teaches in a school with his wife Anitha, and Sahadevan a ruthless leader of the Communist Party.

Roy and two of his friends expose a case of corruption in which Sahadevan is involved. The two friends are mysteriously murdered, while Roy is spared; purportedly because of Sahadevan's respect for Roy's father. Sahadevan tells Roy about his painful childhood, claiming that his actions are aimed at ensuring that his followers and his own children do not suffer as he and his ancestors did.

Roy's friend and neighbour Jayan grows close to Jennifer. Once, when her estranged husband assaults her, he attacks him, resulting in his death. He is placed under investigation, but learns that Sahadevan might be able to help him. Sahadevan agrees to help if he apologises to some of Sahadevan's loyalists whom he had insulted earlier. Jayan refuses.

One day, Roy collapses and is taken to a hospital. The doctor is enjoying a game of billiards with his friends, and lies that he is busy. His assistant is unable to save Roy. Anitha tells Jayan the story of their old friendship with Sahadevan, and how Roy's idealism and Sahadevan's use of violence and trickery soured the relationship. Jayan finally learns that Sahadevan had once hired goons to attack Roy, maiming him for life and eventually leading to his death. In his anger, he stabs Sahadevan, killing him. Jayan is then arrested by the police.

Cast

Indrajith Sukumaran as SI P.K. Jayan a.k.a. Vattu Jayan
Murali Gopy as Roy Joseph a.k.a. Che Guevara Roy
Hareesh Peradi as Kaitheri Sahadevan and Kaitheri Chathu
Lena Kumar as Anitha Roy
Remya Nambeesan as Jennifer Kuruvilla
Anusree Nair as Deepa
Sethu Lakshmi as Lathika, Jayan's mother
Jagadish as S.I. Raju
Mamukkoya as Kasim
Vijayaraghavan as Comrade S.R.
Baiju as Advocate Preman
Suraj Venjaramoodu as Mohammed Bilal (Superintendent of Police)
Sudheer Karamana as Aliyar
Saiju Kurup as Mathews
Sreejith Ravi as Suresh Kumar. B
Irshad as Police Constable Siddharthan
Deepa Jayan
Lakshmi Sanal 
Dinesh Prabhakar as Anil
Ramesh Pisharody as Chandran, BBVP Member
Ahamed Siddique as Jason Fernandez
Dinesh Panicker as Dr. Vinod, Roy's Doctor 
Balaji as Hassan, Aliyar's Brother-in-law
Poojappura Radhakrishnan as Ganeshan, House Owner
Ram Mohan as College HOD
Krishnan as Goon
Krishna Prabha as Serial Actress
Rangan as Comrade 1
Shabu as Comrade 2
Ganesh as Comrade 3
Sreedhanya as Anu
Master Appu as Young Sahadevan
Achuthanandan as Moncy
Master Unnikrishnan as Leo
Master Abel as Young Roy

Production
Shooting began on 20 December at Thiruvananthapuram. The main locations were Thiruvananthapuram, Nagercoil and Hyderabad. The official pre-shoot teaser and theatrical trailer of the movie were a hit on YouTube. A character promo video of the movie was released, the first of its kind in a Malayalam film. The video titled 'LRL Anthem', sung by Murali Gopy, gives a glimpse of the incidents that shape the personalities and mindset of the three main characters in the movie.

Controversies
The film got numerous publicity since its release by resembling many real life characters of the Communist party. The film criticizes the degradation of the political Left in the state from a force which kicked off social revolutions to a gang that indulges in violence and elimination of dissidents, creating party villages and a building a zombie supporter base. The focus is on the three central characters – a Communist leader, a former Communist activist who is disappointed by the party's current ways and a reckless cop. There are obvious (albeit indirect) references to the differences between CPI(M) strongman Pinarayi Vijayan and ex-Chief Minister V. S. Achuthanandan. The character Kaitheri Sahdevan in the movie resembles a sketch of Mr Pinarayi Vijayan.

Reception

Critical response

The Times of India rated the movie (3/5) and stated that "Loads of brilliance goes into each character. Few films have shown more intensity in depicting the effects of politics on individuals than Left Right Left." Jabir Mushthari of The Hindu found the movie to be refreshing and said, "The movie entertainingly refers to a number of issues presently faced by society even while seeking answers to certain key questions such as who is a "real communist" and what their plight is in the changing scenario." Malayala Manorama rated the movie (3/5) and called it a 'feast for discerning film connoisseurs'. Deccan Chronicle rated the movie (3.5/5). Suresh Kumar of East Coast Daily compared the movie to classics from the Golden Era of Malayalam Film.

Veeyen of Nowrunning.com rated the film (3/5) and said "'Left Right Left' has a rare, melancholic, poetic power that is magical in more ways than one. It invites the audience to delve deep beneath the rugged, craggy portrait of the society that we live in. A glorious tale on perseverance, struggles and survival, 'Left Right Left' enters the pantheon of must-see movies with grace." Sify.com rated the movie as Good. Yentha.com rated the movie (3.5/5)and said that "For anyone who is exasperated by the ragbag of 'one time watch' films now-a-days, this film is a relief." Oneindia.in stated that the movie has a hard-hitting tale, which is thought provoking and sure to start serious debate on the topic that it deals with. Webdunia.com called it the best Malayalam movie of recent times. Paresh C Palicha of Rediff.com called it a brilliant movie and said "The film can be described as intense, gritty, real, brave and most of all, honest. It depicts the degradation of politics today and tries to analyse where it all comes from, justifying the tagline 'Revolution is home made." G Krishnamurthy of Movieraga opined that Left Right Left is not a movie, but a mirror image of the political and social set up in Kerala.

Accolades
Kerala State Film Award
Second Best Actress - Lena
61st Filmfare Awards South 
The Best Actor in a Supporting Role - Murali Gopy
3rd South Indian International Movie Awards
Best Actor in Supporting Role - Murali Gopy
Best Fight Choreographer - Thyagarajan
Asiavision Movie Award
Best Screenplay - Murali Gopy
Outstanding Movie
The New Sensation in Singing - Murali Gopy
Outstanding Performer - Indrajith Sukumaran
Nana Film Awards
Second Best Movie
Man of the Year - Murali Gopy
Best Makeup Man - Rahim Kodungallur
Thikkurissi Sukumaran Foundation Awards
The Best Supporting Actor - Murali Gopy
The Best Supporting Actress - Lena
Jaihind Film Awards
The Best Script - Murali Gopy
The Second Best Actor - Indrajith Sukumaran

Soundtrack

References

External links

2013 films
2010s Malayalam-language films
2010s political thriller films
Films critical of communism
Fictional portrayals of the Kerala Police
Films shot in Thiruvananthapuram
Indian political thriller films
Films with screenplays by Murali Gopy
Films scored by Gopi Sundar
Films directed by Arun Kumar Aravind